Scythris brummanae is a moth of the family Scythrididae. It was described by Pietro Passerin d'Entrèves and Angela Roggero in 2012. It is found in Lebanon.

References

brummanae
Moths described in 2012